IMP or imp may refer to:

 Imp, a fantasy creature

Arts and entertainment

Fictional characters
 Imp (She-Ra), a character in She-Ra: Princess of Power
 Imp a character in Artemis Fowl: The Lost Colony
 Imp, a character in the Clan Destine series of Marvel Comics
 Imp, nickname of Tyrion Lannister, a character from A Song of Ice and Fire series

Games
 International Match Points, in contract bridge 
 Imp, a small Zombie that can appear randomly in Plants vs. Zombies
 Imp (Dungeons & Dragons), a type of fictional lower level devil in the Dungeons & Dragons role-playing game
 Imp (Shattered Galaxy), an infantry Unit in the MMORPG Shattered Galaxy
 Imp, fire and ice enemies in the video game Hexen II 
 Imp, enemy in the video game Doom series
 Imp, popular pet used by Warlocks in World of Warcraft
 Imp, monster enemy in Geist
 Imp, worker units in RTS Dungeon Keeper and its sequel
 Imp, short for members of the Empire ("Imperials") from Star Wars Galaxies and various Star Wars games
 Midna, a main character from The Legend of Zelda: Twilight Princess, who resembles an imp for most of the game
 Implementer (video games), a term for developers in the Zork series and in DikuMUDs
 International Match Point, one form of scoring in duplicate bridge
 Imps, the cursor in the UGC game Dreams_(video_game)

Science and technology
 Research Institute of Molecular Pathology, a molecular biology research institute in Vienna
 Imager for Mars Pathfinder, a camera on board the Mars Pathfinder lander
 imipenem/cilastatin, an antibiotic combination
 Interplanetary Monitoring Platform, a series of NASA space science missions within the Explorer program, launched between 1966 and 1973
 Investigational medicinal product, medication used in a clinical trial
 Inosine monophosphate, a nucleotide
 Integral membrane protein, a class of proteins attached to cell membranes
 blaIMP (IMP), a type of metallo-beta-lactamase conferring resistance against carbapenem antibiotics
 N-Isopropyl-(123I)-p-iodoamphetamine, or iofetamine (123I), a diagnostic radiopharmaceutical
 Irregular mare patch, a smooth area in the lunar maria.
 Imp, a baby Tasmanian devil

Computing
 Interface Message Processor, a packet-switching node for connecting computers to ARPANET (modern term: router)
 IMP programming language, a systems programming language for the CDC 6600
 Edinburgh IMP, a systems programming language used in the EMAS operating system
 Internet Messaging Program, a webmail client

 Intercept Modernisation Programme, a proposal by the UK government to centralise the storage electronic communications traffic data
 Integrated Middleware Platform, for external system aiming to service logic communication
 Information Module Profile, a subset of the Mobile Information Device Profile
 Interactive Media Player (iMP), the former name of the BBC iPlayer

Organizations
 Imparja Television (callsign IMP), an Australian television broadcaster
 IMP Group International, a Canadian investment corporation, operator of Cascade Aerospace
 Independent Moving Pictures, an early movie studio absorbed by Universal in 1912
 Industrial Marketing and Purchasing Group, a European research initiative in the field of Industrial marketing
 International Music Publications, a British sheet music publisher
 IMP Society, a secret society at the University of Virginia
 Incentive Mentoring Program, a non-profit organization aiming to transform the lives of Baltimore teenagers failing high school
 Institute of Modern Politics, a Bulgarian think-tank
 Israeli Military Police or Investigating Military Police (Criminal Investigations Division/CID)
 Research Institute of Molecular Pathology, a basic biomedical research center at the Campus Vienna Biocenter

Transportation
 Hillman Imp, a British car of the 1960s-1970s
 Subaru Impreza, a Japanese car, nicknamed Imp
 Thiokol 1404 IMP, a 1970s snowcat made by Thiokol

Other uses
 Interactive Mathematics Program, a Key Curriculum Press Interactive Math curriculum
 Isle of Man pound, or Manx pound
 Imp (horse), American Champion Thoroughbred racehorse
 "IMP", Latin abbreviation used on British coins up to 1947, such as the British two shilling coin
 Individual Meal Pack, a ration used by the Canadian Armed Forces
 Integrated master plan, a part of project planning
 Brown University International Mentoring Program, a student-based program at Brown University
 Imping, the practice of fixing a broken feather of a bird

See also
 IMPS (disambiguation)
 The Imp (disambiguation)